Jack Rodewald (born February 14, 1994) is a Canadian professional ice hockey forward who is currently playing under contract with Kunlun Red Star of the Kontinental Hockey League (KHL).

Playing career
Undrafted, Rodewald played major junior with the Regina Pats and Moose Jaw Warriors in the Western Hockey League. Upon completion of his final season with the Warriors in 2014–15, he embarked on his professional career by signing as a free agent to a one-year AHL contract with the Toronto Marlies on March 26, 2015. He joined the club immediately on an amateur try-out in closing out the season with 1 assist in 9 games.

In the beginning of his second season playing within the Ottawa Senators AHL affiliate's in 2017–18, Rodewald signed his first NHL contract in agreeing to a two-year entry-level contract with the Senators on October 24, 2017. He was immediately recalled by Ottawa and made his NHL debut in a 5–4 shootout defeat to the New Jersey Devils on October 27, 2017.

On June 27, 2019, Rodewald was signed to a one-year, two-way $725,000 contract extension to remain with the Senators. Rodewald began the 2019–20 season in the AHL with the Belleville Senators. After going scoreless in 6 games, Rodewald was traded by the Senators to the Florida Panthers in exchange for the rights of Chris Wilkie on October 27, 2019.

As a free agent from the Panthers, Rodewald in order to continue his career opted sign abroad in Europe, signing mid-season in to the 2020–21 campaign with Czech club, HC Oceláři Třinec of the ELH, on January 3, 2021.

Career statistics

References

External links

1994 births
Living people
Belleville Senators players
Binghamton Senators players
Canadian expatriate ice hockey players in the United States
Canadian ice hockey right wingers
HC Kunlun Red Star players
Moose Jaw Warriors players
HC Oceláři Třinec players
Orlando Solar Bears (ECHL) players
Ottawa Senators players
Regina Pats players
Ice hockey people from Winnipeg
Springfield Thunderbirds players
Toronto Marlies players
HC TPS players
Undrafted National Hockey League players
Wichita Thunder players
Canadian expatriate ice hockey players in the Czech Republic
Canadian expatriate ice hockey players in China
Canadian expatriate ice hockey players in Finland